Taylor's writhing skink or pygmy supple skink (Subdoluseps frontoparietalis) is a species of skink found in Thailand.

References

Subdoluseps
Reptiles described in 1962
Reptiles of Thailand
Endemic fauna of Thailand
Taxa named by Edward Harrison Taylor